Robert Charles Forsyth (born 8 June 1949) is an Australian Anglican bishop who served as the Anglican Bishop of South Sydney, a region of the Anglican Diocese of Sydney, from 2000 to 2015. Before this he was the rector of St. Barnabas, Broadway.

Forsyth is married to Margie and has four children and ten grandchildren. He attended Meadowbank Boys High School and was a candidate for the Methodist ministry for a number of years but changed to Anglican candidature in 1972. 

On 19 January 2008, Forsyth condemned Corpus Christi, a play depicting Judas seducing Jesus: "It is deliberately, not innocently, offensive and they're obviously having a laugh about it." The play also showed Jesus administrating a marriage between two of his male apostles.

References

External links
Profile on the Diocese of Sydney's website (archive 2015-02-27)
"Just a fiery glitch", an article in the Sydney Morning Herald after St Barnabas' church building was destroyed by fire.
"Church spends $50K to debunk Da Vinci claims", a story from the Sydney Morning Herald about the Sydney diocese's response to The Da Vinci Code.
"Church acts against Da Vinci film", a story from BBC News.

Assistant bishops in the Anglican Diocese of Sydney
Living people
1949 births